Robert Samuel "Sam" Gwynn (born 1948, Eden, North Carolina) is an American poet and anthologist associated with New Formalism.

Life
Gwynn is married and lives in Beaumont, Texas. He graduated from Davidson College in 1969, where he won the Vereen Bell Award for creative writing twice, played varsity football, and was a member of the school's championship team on the General Electric College Bowl. He did graduate work at Middlebury College's Bread Loaf School of English and later earned an M.A. and an M.F.A. from the University of Arkansas.

Poetry and Career
Gwynn's first full-length book, The Drive-in, won the Breakthrough Award of the University of Missouri Press in 1986. He has received the Michael Braude Award for Light Verse of the American Academy of Arts and Letters, served as an original faculty member of the West Chester University Conference on Form and Narrative in Poetry, and was included in the first significant anthology of New Formalism, Rebel Angels: Twenty-five Poets of the New Formalism (Story Line Press 1995). In 1997, Gwynn was selected as a University Professor at Lamar University, and he has been honored by Phi Kappa Phi. In September, 2015, he was appointed Program Director of the West Chester University Poetry Conference.

Critical reception
In his introduction to Gwynn's volume No Word of Farewell: Poems 1970-2000, Dana Gioia, poet and former chair of the National Endowment for the Arts, wrote, "[Gwynn] is ingeniously funny...[and] an effortless master of verse forms. No American poet of his generation has written better sonnets, and very few can equal him in the ballade, couplet, rondeau, or pantoum–not to mention the half dozen new forms he has invented"; further, according to Gioia, "Gwynn juxtaposes styles and subjects not customarily seen together–mythic and modish images phrased in language alternatively sublime and debased–but told with such force of imagination and assured musicality that the resulting poems seem not idiosyncratic but inevitable."

A collection of Gwynn's papers is housed at Texas State University at San Marcos in the Southwestern Writers Collection. A link to this collection can be found on T.A.R.O. (Texas Archival Resources Online.)

Works
 Bearing & Distance, Cedar Rock Press 1977 
 The Narcissiad, Cedar Rock Press, 1981, 
 The Drive-in, University of Missouri Press, 1986, 
 No Word of Farewell: Poems 1970-2000, Story Line Press, 2001, 
 Dogwatch, Measure Press, 2014,

Editor

Contemporary American Poetry: A Pocket Anthology, Pearson/Longman, 2005.

References

External links
 A Guide to the R. S. Gwynn Papers, 1976-1994

American male poets
Formalist poets
1948 births
Living people
Lamar University people
West Chester University faculty
People from Eden, North Carolina